Chengbei Subdistrict is a subdistrict of Fucheng District, Mianyang, Sichuan, People's Republic of China, occupying the northern portion of the district as its name suggests. , it has 13 residential communities (社区) under its administration.

See also 
 List of township-level divisions of Sichuan

References 

Township-level divisions of Sichuan
Mianyang
Subdistricts of the People's Republic of China